Refandy (Räfände; , Kozaš) is a rural locality (a village) in Novotroitsky Selsoviet, Mishkinsky District, Bashkortostan, Russia. The population was 249 as of 2010. There are 7 streets.

Geography 
Refandy is located 26 km northeast of Mishkino (the district's administrative centre) by road. Biryubash is the nearest rural locality.

References 

Rural localities in Mishkinsky District